Vanja Ilić (10 February 1927 – 10 November 2018) was a Yugoslav swimmer. He competed in two events at the 1948 Summer Olympics. He was a member of swimming club Jadran Split. With the death of Željko Čajkovski on 11 November 2016, he became the oldest Croatian Olympic participant.

References

External links

1927 births
2018 deaths
Yugoslav male swimmers
Croatian male swimmers
Olympic swimmers of Yugoslavia
Swimmers at the 1948 Summer Olympics